On Your Side is the second studio album by Norwegian musician Magnet. The album was first released in Japan on 28 May 2003, on 23 June 2003 in Norway, 7 July 2003 in the United Kingdom, and 28 September 2004 in the United States. It contains a cover of Bob Dylan's "Lay Lady Lay" featuring Gemma Hayes, which was featured in the 2005 film Mr. & Mrs. Smith.

Three EPs preceded the album's release: Where Happiness Lives in June 2002, Chasing Dreams in September 2002, and The Day We Left Town in April 2003. Additionally, two singles followed to promote the album: "Last Day of Summer" in November 2003, and the aforementioned "Lay Lady Lay" in March 2004.

Track listing

The US release of the album includes the same bonus tracks, but switches the placement of tracks 13 and 14.

Singles
 "Where Happiness Lives" on the Where Happiness Lives EP (3 June 2002)
 "Chasing Dreams" on the Chasing Dreams EP (23 September 2002)
 "The Day We Left Town" on The Day We Left Town EP (21 April 2003)
 "Last Day of Summer" (24 November 2003)
 "Lay Lady Lay" (22 March 2004)
 "On Your Side" (remixes by Optimo) (promo only, 2004)

References

Magnet (musician) albums
2003 albums